The 2020 Trofeo Faip–Perrel was a professional tennis tournament played on hard courts. It was the fifteenth edition of the tournament which was part of the 2020 ATP Challenger Tour. It took place in Bergamo, Italy between 17 and 23 February 2020.

Singles main-draw entrants

Seeds

 1 Rankings were as of 10 February 2020.

Other entrants
The following players received wildcards into the singles main draw:
  Leo Borg
  Flavio Cobolli
  Matteo Gigante
  Francesco Maestrelli
  Luca Nardi

The following players received entry from the qualifying draw:
  Sadio Doumbia
  Tseng Chun-hsin

The following player received entry as a lucky loser:
  Pavel Nejedlý

Champions

Singles

 Illya Marchenko vs.  Enzo Couacaud canceled due to coronavirus.

Doubles

 Zdeněk Kolář /  Julian Ocleppo def.  Luca Margaroli /  Andrea Vavassori 6–4, 6–3.

References

2020 ATP Challenger Tour
2020
2020 in Italian sport
February 2020 sports events in Italy
Sports events curtailed due to the COVID-19 pandemic